The Hauraki Rail Trail is one of the Great Rides of the New Zealand Cycle Trail system, using parts of the abandoned ECMT and Thames Branch railways in the Hauraki Gulf plains and the Coromandel Peninsula. 

The  trail officially starts from Kaiaua in the north and traces the Shorebird Coast along the Firth of Thames before heading south via Paeroa to then branch either east towards Waihi (via the Karangahake Gorge) or south to Te Aroha.

The trail takes around three days to complete for most fitness levels. It is one of the easiest cycle trails in New Zealand and offers a diverse range of scenery, from pohutukawa trees, through lush farm land, and onto some of New Zealand's pioneering past.

Length and extensions 
The trail was opened in 2012, with 95% of 69 km completed at the end of 2012, and all of the original length open from early 2013 (New Zealand Cycle Trail's official website).

Scoping for a further section, from Kopu to Kaiaua along the Firth of Thames' coast was expected to start in mid-2013, adding another  to the track. It opened in August 2020.

Popularity
In 2013 the trail was described as the most popular cycle trail in New Zealand, despite only having been open for less than a year. From January 2013 to April 2013, monthly cycle counts on the busiest section (Karangahake Gorge) averaged over 7,000 cyclists a month. The trail was particularly popular with the "baby boomer" and family clientele from Auckland and the wider Waikato, with 24% of users coming from Auckland, 15% from Hamilton, and a large proportion of users being older riders – based on a University of Waikato survey. Both local businesses and Council agree that the trail had a significant economic benefit for the region, and had already become a major promotional asset for tourism.

Awards 

The new wooden bridges on the rail trail received the "Sustainability Award" in the Timber Design Awards in 2012.

References

External links 
Hauraki Rail Trail on the New Zealand Cycle Trail website
Hauraki Rail Trail on the temporary website of the administering trust

Thames-Coromandel District
Hiking and tramping tracks in Waikato
Rail trails in New Zealand
New Zealand Cycle Trail
Hauraki District
Firth of Thames